X is the tenth studio album released by the band Royal Hunt on 20 January 2010, on Scarlet Records in Europe and on Marquee/Avalon Records in Japan.

Track listing
All songs written by André Andersen.
 "Episode X (Arrival)" - 1:59
 "End of the Line" - 4:49
 "King for a Day" - 4:49
 "The Well" - 4:52
 "Army of Slaves" - 6:00
 "Shadowman" - 5:35
 "Back to Square One" - 5:24
 "Blood Red Stars" - 6:21
 "The Last Leaf" - 4:25
 "Falling Down" - 4:15
 "Episode X (Departure)" - 1:06
 "Sixth Sense" (European bonus track) - 4:25

Personnel

Band members
Mark Boals – vocals
Marcus Jidell – guitar
André Andersen – keyboards and guitar, producer
Andreas Passmark – bass
Allan Sørensen  – drums

Additional musicians
Kenny Lubcke, Maria McTurk, Henrik Brockmann, Michelle Raitzin, Gertrud Mogelgaard – backing vocals

Production
Recorded at North Point Productions, Media Sound and Sun Studios
Michelle Raitzin's vocals recorded by Bill Malina at Sherman Oaks Studios, Los Angeles
Mixed at Puk Studios by Lars Overgaard and André Andersen
Mastered by Jan Eliasson at Audio Planet
Cover, booklet & artwork design by Kai Brockschmidt
Photography: Allen Ross Thomas
Management: Michael Raitzin/Majestic Ent. Co LLC.

Charts

References

Royal Hunt albums
2010 albums
Scarlet Records albums